Tracy Duncan (born 12 November 1971) is a Canadian rower. She competed in the women's lightweight double sculls event at the 2000 Summer Olympics.

References

External links
 

1971 births
Living people
Canadian female rowers
Olympic rowers of Canada
Rowers at the 2000 Summer Olympics
Rowers from Winnipeg
Pan American Games medalists in rowing
Pan American Games silver medalists for Canada
Pan American Games bronze medalists for Canada
Rowers at the 1999 Pan American Games
Medalists at the 1999 Pan American Games
21st-century Canadian women
20th-century Canadian women